The following players were selected for the 2017 Caribbean Premier League:

Barbados Tridents
 Kieron Pollard
 Kane Williamson
 Shoaib Malik
 Dwayne Smith
 Nicholas Pooran
 Wayne Parnell
 Ravi Rampaul
 Wahab Riaz
 Raymon Reifer
 Christopher Barnwell
 Imran Khan
 Damion Jacobs
 Akeal Hosein
 Ryan Wiggins
 Tino Best
 Shamar Springer
 Akeem Dodson
 AB de Villiers
 Eoin Morgan

Guyana Amazon Warriors
 Sohail Tanvir
 Martin Guptill
 Chadwick Walton
 Chris Lynn
 Rayad Emrit
 Rashid Khan
 Jason Mohammed
 Steven Taylor
 Veerasammy Permaul
 Roshon Primus
 Gajanand Singh
 Assad Fudadin
 Keon Joseph
 Steven Jacobs
 Steven Katwaroo
 Shimron Hetmyer
 Ali Khan

Babar Azam replaced Chris Lynn, who was injured.

Jamaica Tallawahs
 Lendl Simmons
 Kumar Sangakkara
 Shakib Al Hasan
 Imad Wasim
 Mohammad Sami
 Rovman Powell
 Gidron Pope
 Kesrick Williams
 Garey Mathurin
 Jon-Russ Jaggesar
 Krishmar Santokie
 Jonathan Foo
 Kennar Lewis
 Andre McCarthy
 Odean Smith
 Oshane Thomas
 Timroy Allen

St Kitts and Nevis Patriots
 Chris Gayle
 Chris Morris
 Ben Cutting
 Mohammad Nabi
 Evin Lewis
 Samuel Badree
 Jonathan Carter
 Tabraiz Shamsi
 Brandon King
 Devon Thomas
 Sheldon Cottrell
 Kieran Powell
 Fabian Allen
 Shamarh Brooks
 Jeremiah Louis
 Alzarri Joseph
 Nikhil Dutta
 Carlos Brathwaite

Mohammad Hafeez and Hasan Ali replaced Ben Cutting and Kieran Powell respectively.

St Lucia Stars
 David Miller
 Lasith Malinga
 Shane Watson
 Darren Sammy
 Johnson Charles
 Andre Fletcher
 Jerome Taylor
 Marlon Samuels
 Kamran Akmal
 Rahkeem Cornwall
 Kyle Mayers
 Shane Shillingford
 Eddie Leie
 Keddy Lesporis
 Sunil Ambris
 Obed McCoy
 Timil Patel

Trinbago Knight Riders
 Dwayne Bravo
 Brendon McCullum
 Sunil Narine
 Hashim Amla
 Darren Bravo
 Denesh Ramdin
 Colin Munro
 Shadab Khan
 Khary Pierre
 Ronsford Beaton
 Javon Searles
 Nikita Miller
 William Perkins
 Kevon Cooper
 Anderson Phillip
 Hamza Tariq
Mehedi Hasan Miraz

References

External links

Caribbean Premier League